The 2021 Seattle City Attorney election was held on November 2, 2021. Incumbent City Attorney Pete Holmes sought reelection to a fourth term in office, but came third place in the officially nonpartisan August 3 primary election and failed to advance to the general election, with both Nicole Thomas-Kennedy and Ann Davison finishing ahead of Holmes in the primary. Davison defeated Thomas-Kennedy in the general election.

Primary election

Candidates

Declared
Ann Davison (Republican), commercial lawyer, Republican candidate for Lieutenant Governor in 2020, and nominee for Seattle City Council District 5 in 2019
Pete Holmes (Democratic), incumbent Seattle City Attorney (2010–present)
Nicole Thomas-Kennedy (Democratic), abolitionist, former public defender, and pro bono defense attorney

Withdrawn
Steve Fortney (Democratic), former U.S. Department of Justice lawyer

Endorsements

Polling

Results

General election

Candidates

Declared
Ann Davison (Republican), commercial lawyer, Republican candidate for Lieutenant Governor in 2020, and nominee for Seattle City Council District 5 in 2019
Nicole Thomas-Kennedy (Democratic), abolitionist, former public defender, and pro bono defense attorney

Endorsements

Campaign finance
Candidate totals raised are as of filings on or before November 2, 2021 and totals spent reflect expenditures up to October 25, 2021. Independent expenditures are up-to-date as of filings on or before November 1, 2021.

Polling
Graphical summary

Results

Notes

Partisan clients

References

External links
Official campaign websites
Ann Davison for Seattle City Attorney
Pete Holmes for Seattle City Attorney
Nicole Thomas-Kennedy for Seattle City Attorney

Seattle City Attorney
Seattle City Attorney
Seattle City Attorney 2021